Jerónimo Martins SGPS, SA (JM) is a Portuguese corporate group that operates in food distribution and specialised retail. It operates more than 4,900 stores in Portugal, Poland, and Colombia.

The group is the majority owner of Jerónimo Martins Retail (JMR), which operates the Pingo Doce super- and hypermarket chain in Portugal. JMR has been run as a 51%-49% joint venture with the Dutch firm Ahold Delhaize since 1982.

Jerónimo Martins is listed on Euronext Lisbon, under the code JMT, and is part of the PSI-20 index.

Operations
In Portugal, Jerónimo Martins operates the Pingo Doce chain of super- and hypermarkets as well as the Recheio chain of cash-and-carry stores.

The Group also operates in the specialized retail sector in Portugal. Jerónimo Martins owns the Jeronymo coffee shops and the Hussel chocolate and confectionery stores.

Until 2016, Jerónimo Martins had industrial facilities focused on the production of several Unilever brands. This was carried out through the joint venture company Unilever Jerónimo Martins, which was 45% owned by JM and 55% owned by Unilever.

Jerónimo Martins also owns Biedronka, the largest chain of no-frills supermarkets in Poland. Also in Poland, the Group operates the health and beauty and cosmetic chain Hebe.

In 2013, Jerónimo Martins Group started its operations in Colombia with the opening of the first Ara  stores as well as its and the first distribution centre.

Former operations
It once owned Lillywhites, a British company focused on sports goods (sold in 2002 to Sports World International); a stake in Eurocash, a cash-and-carry in Poland; and Supermercados Sé, a supermarket chain in Brazil (sold to Grupo Pão de Açúcar in 2002).

Key Figures

See also
 Pingo Doce
 Recheio
 Biedronka

References

External links

Companies based in Lisbon
Food and drink companies of Portugal
Retail companies established in 1792
Conglomerate companies of Portugal
Multinational companies headquartered in Portugal